The Archdiocese of Louisville is a Latin Church ecclesiastical territory or archdiocese of the Catholic Church that consists of twenty-four counties in the central American state of Kentucky, covering . As of 2018, the archdiocese contains approximately 200,000 Catholics in 66,000 households, served by one hundred twenty-two parishes and missions staffed by one hundred sixty-six diocesan priests, one hundred twelve permanent deacons, fifty-two religious institute priests, seventy-seven religious brothers, and nine hundred forty-four religious sisters.

One half of all Catholics in the Commonwealth of Kentucky reside within the archdiocese, and seventy-nine percent of all Catholics in the archdiocese (forty percent of all Catholics in the Commonwealth) reside in the Louisville metropolitan area. There are fifty-nine Catholic elementary and high schools serving more than 23,400 students. The archdiocese serves more than 220,000 persons in Catholic hospitals, health care centers, homes for the aged, and specialized homes. Services, mother-infant care program, senior social services, and rural ministries services.  The cathedral church of the archdiocese is the Cathedral of the Assumption. It is the seat of the metropolitan see of the Province of Louisville, which encompasses the states of Kentucky and Tennessee.

The Archdiocese of Louisville is the oldest inland diocese in the United States, but not the oldest diocese west of the Appalachians. That distinction belongs to the Roman Catholic Archdiocese of New Orleans, erected in territory under Spanish rule in 1793 that became part of the United States through the Louisiana Purchase in 1803.

History

Background 

On 8 April 1808, Pope Pius VII concurrently erected the Diocese of Bardstown, the Diocese of Boston, the Diocese of New York, and the Diocese of Philadelphia in territory taken from the Roman Catholic Archdiocese of Baltimore, and simultaneously elevated the Diocese of Baltimore to a metropolitan archdiocese with the four new dioceses as its suffragans. At that time, Bardstown, Kentucky was a thriving frontier settlement. (Pope Benedict XVI's visit to the U.S. in April 2008 celebrated the bicentenary of this event). The initial territory of the Diocese of Bardstown included most of the new states of Kentucky, Tennessee, Missouri, Illinois, Indiana, Ohio, and Michigan — the western territories of America to the Mississippi River and the Louisiana Purchase of 1803. The same pope appointed Benedict Joseph Flaget as the first Bishop of Bardstown.

Under Bishop Flaget's leadership, the new diocese began construction of St. Joseph Cathedral in 1816, and celebrated the first mass in the structure in 1819 even though construction continued until 1823. That building continued to serve as a parish church after the transfer to of the see to Louisville (see below). On 18 July 2001, Pope John Paul II designated it as a minor basilica.

On 19 June 1821, Pope Pius VII erected the Diocese of Cincinnati, taking its territory from the Diocese of Bardstown. Its initial territory encompassed the entire present states of Ohio, Michigan, Wisconsin, and Minnesota, and portions of North Dakota and South Dakota that are east of the Missouri River.

On 6 May 1834, Pope Gregory XVI erected the Diocese of Vincennes, taking its territory from the Diocese of Bardstown. The territory of the new diocese encompassed the present state of Indiana and the eastern portion of Illinois.

On 28 July 1837, the same pope erected the Diocese of Nashville, taking its territory from the Diocese of Bardstown. The territory of the new diocese encompassed the present state of Tennessee. This action reduced territory of the Diocese of Bardstown to that of the present state of Kentucky.

Transfer to Louisville 
On 13 February 1841, the same pope transferred the see from Bardstown to Louisville, changing the title of the diocese to Diocese of Louisville and designating St. Louis Church in Louisville as its new cathedral. However, Bishop Flaget determined that the diocese needed a new cathedral in 1849 and started construction of the Cathedral of the Assumption, but died on 11 February 1850, a few months after laying the cornerstone, leaving it to his successor, Bishop Martin John Spalding, to complete the construction. Bishop Spalding dedicated the new cathedral on 3 October 1852. The new cathedral was built around St. Louis Cathedral, which was then disassembled and carried piece by piece out the doors of the larger structure.

On 29 July 1853, Pope Pius IX erected the Diocese of Covington, taking its initial territory, the eastern portion of Kentucky, from the Diocese of Louisville.

The French may have had initial influence in the formation of the Roman Catholic community in the Louisville area, but immigrants from Germany eventually comprised the bulk of the Archdiocese's communicant strength later in the mid-19th century, particularly in the city of Louisville. However, much of the Catholic population in areas southeast of Louisville is of English extraction, consisting of descendants of recusants who originally settled in Maryland in colonial times.

On 9 December 1937, Pope Pius XI erected the Diocese of Owensboro, taking its territory, the western portion of Kentucky, from the Diocese of Louisville and simultaneously elevating the Diocese of Louisville to a metropolitan archdiocese. and assigning the Diocese of Covington, the new Diocese of Owensboro, and the Diocese of Nashville.

On 20 June 1970, Pope Paul VI erected the Diocese of Memphis, taking its territory, the western portion of the state of Tennessee, from the Diocese of Nashville and making it another suffragan of the Archdiocese of Louisville.

On 14 January 1988, Pope John Paul II erected the Diocese of Lexington, taking its territory from the Archdiocese of Louisville and the Diocese of Covington and making it another suffragan of the Archdiocese of Louisville. This action established the present territory of the Archdiocese of Louisville.

On 27 May 1988, the same pope erected the Diocese of Knoxville, taking its territory, the eastern portion of the state of Tennessee, from the Diocese of Nashville and making it an additional suffragan of the Archdiocese of Louisville. This action established the present configuration of the Metropolitan Province of Louisville.

Sexual abuse
In 2003, the Archdiocese of Louisville paid $25.7 million directly from its own assets to settle claims of sexual abuse by its clergy. Reports of abuse extended back to the 1940s, were alleged to have continued to 1997, and involved 34 priests, two religious brothers, and three lay people. In 2009, the Diocese of Covington paid 243 victims an average of $254,000 after they were victimized by 35 priests. The total settlement, $79 million, was the sixth largest in the US (as of 2017).

In 2019, Father Joseph Hemmerle, who was convicted in 2016 for molesting a ten-year-old boy while serving at the Camp Tall Trees summer camp in 1973, lost a bid for appeal. Hemmerle, who was also denied parole in 2017, is serving a seven-year prison sentence for this crime, which was recommended following his conviction. In 2017, he received an additional two years after pleading guilty to molesting another boy at Camp Tall Trees in 1977 and 1978.

Bishops
The lists of bishops and their years of service:

Bishops of Bardstown
 Benedict Joseph Flaget, S.S. (1808–1832), resigned but reappointed in 1833
 John Baptist Mary David, S.S. (1832–1833; coadjutor bishop 1819–1832)
 Benedict Joseph Flaget, S.S. (1833–1841), title changed with title of diocese  Guy Ignatius Chabrat, S.S. (coadjutor bishop 1834–1841), title changed with title of diocese

Bishops of Louisville
 Benedict Joseph Flaget, S.S. (1841–1850)  - Guy Ignatius Chabrat, S.S. (coadjutor bishop 1841–1847), resigned before succession
 Martin John Spalding (1850–1864; coadjutor bishop 1848–1850), appointed Archbishop of Baltimore
 Peter Joseph Lavialle (1865–1867)
 William George McCloskey (1868–1909)
 Denis O'Donaghue (1910–1924)
 John A. Floersh (1924–1937); elevated to Archbishop

Archbishops of Louisville
 John A. Floersh (1937–1967)
 Thomas Joseph McDonough (1967–1981)
 Thomas Cajetan Kelly, O.P (1981–2007)
 Joseph Edward Kurtz (2007–2022)
 Shelton Fabre (2022–present)

Auxiliary bishop
 Charles Garrett Maloney (1954–1988)

Other priests of this diocese who became bishops
 John McGill, appointed Bishop of Richmond in 1850
 John Lancaster Spalding, appointed Bishop of Peoria in 1876
 Michael Heiss, appointed Bishop of La Crosse in 1868 and later Archbishop of Milwaukee
 James Ryan, appointed Bishop of Alton in 1888
 Theodore Henry Reverman, appointed Bishop of Superior in 1926
 Francis Ridgley Cotton, appointed Bishop of Owensboro in 1937
 James Kendrick Williams, appointed auxiliary bishop of Covington in 1984 and later Bishop of Lexington
 William Francis Medley, appointed Bishop of Owensboro in 2009
 Charles Coleman Thompson, appointed Bishop of Evansville in 2011 and later Archbishop of Indianapolis
 J. Mark Spalding, appointed Bishop of Nashville in 2018

Other notable figures related to of the archdiocese
Father Stephen T. Badin (1768–1853) – The "circuit rider priest". Served the area that would become the Diocese of Bardstown (and later the Archdiocese of Louisville.) The first priest to be ordained in the United States, Father Badin was known as overly strict but zealous.
Father John L. Spalding (1840–1916) - co-founder of Catholic University in Washington, D.C., and was called the "Catholic Emerson" because of his many books of essays. Father Spalding later became the Bishop of Peoria, Illinois.
Father Thomas Merton, O. C. S. O. (January 31, 1915 – December 10, 1968) – American Trappist monk of the Abbey of Gethsemani in the Archdiocese of Louisville (entered in 1941) and author, famed for his writings on Christian spirituality and his work in Buddhist-Christian relations.
Father James C. Maloney (1911–1998) – founded Boys' Haven in Louisville in 1948. His brother is Bishop Charles Maloney.
Monsignor Alfred F. Horrigan (1914–2005) - the founding president of Bellarmine College, now Bellarmine University. He also headed the city's Human Relations commission and was a friend of Thomas Merton.

Coat of arms

Education

High schools
Ten Catholic secondary schools serve more than 6,300 students. Eight of the schools are located in Jefferson County and one in Nelson County. Four of the schools enroll only girls, three enroll only boys, and two are coeducational.

Boys
St. Francis DeSales High School, Louisville
St. Xavier High School, Louisville
Trinity High School, St. Matthews

Girls
Assumption High School, Louisville
Mercy Academy, Louisville
Presentation Academy, Louisville
Sacred Heart Academy, Louisville

Coeducational
Bethlehem High School, Bardstown
Holy Cross High School, Louisville

Other
Pitt Academy, Louisville (special needs school)

Elementary schools

Forty Catholic parish, regional, and special elementary schools serve more than 15,500 students in seven counties of the Archdiocese of Louisville.

Saint Mary Academy, began in 2007 as a merger of Mother of Good Counsel Elementary School and Immaculate Conception School
St. Andrew Academy was established in 2005 following the regionalization of three parish schools in Southwest Jefferson County. The three parish schools that united to combine St. Andrew were Our Lady of Consolation, St. Clement and St. Polycarp. In April 2008, the parishes of St. Clement, Our Lady Help of Christians, Our Lady of Consolation, St. Polycarp and St. Timothy combined to form St. Peter the Apostle. St. Andrew Academy is now the parish school of St. Peter the Apostle.
Notre Dame Academy is a regional K8 school located in Louisville, Kentucky. The school was formed in 2004 from the merger of St. Denis, St. Helen, and St. Lawrence Schools.
Immaculata Classical Academy is an independent Catholic School in Louisville. It enrolls grades PK-12th. It focuses on teaching the traditional ways of the catholic church, students learn Latin and attend Latin mass. Immaculata is known for its inclusion of children with special needs, most notably children with Down Syndrome. It is the first catholic school that includes children with Down Syndrome in an inclusive classroom. About 20% of students at Immaculata have an identified special need.

Metropolitan Province of Louisville

The Metropolitan Province of Louisville covers the states of Kentucky and Tennessee, and comprises the following dioceses:
Archdiocese of Louisville
Diocese of Covington
Diocese of Knoxville
Diocese of Lexington
Diocese of Memphis
Diocese of Nashville
Diocese of Owensboro

See also

 Catholic Church by country
 Catholic Church hierarchy
 List of the Catholic dioceses of the United States
 Religion in Louisville, Kentucky

Notes

External links
Roman Catholic Archdiocese of Louisville Official Site
The Cathedral of the Assumption
1910 Catholic Encyclopedia Article on the Diocese of Louisville

 
1808 establishments in Kentucky
Christianity in Louisville, Kentucky
Louisville
Catholic Church in Kentucky
Louisville
Louisville
Roman Catholic Ecclesiastical Province of Louisville
Religious organizations based in Louisville, Kentucky